Joey Stefano (born Nicholas Anthony Iacona Jr.; January 1, 1968 – November 21, 1994) was an American pornographic actor who appeared in gay pornographic films.

Career
Born Nicholas Anthony Iacona Jr., Stefano grew up in Chester, Pennsylvania. His father, Nicholas, Sr., was a union painter who died of colon cancer when Stefano was 15.  After the death of his father, Stefano began using drugs and was eventually sent to rehab for six months. After rehab, he tried to become a model and built a portfolio. In 1989, he met a gay porn actor named Tony Davis who helped him enter into the gay adult film industry.

Stefano's adult film career took off after meeting Chi Chi LaRue during a trip to Los Angeles. Stefano's looks were well received and his persona as a "hungry bottom" (sexually submissive but verbally demanding) contributed to his popularity. His image and success caught the attention of Madonna, who used him as a model in her 1992 book Sex. While he was a popular performer, Stefano's family had no idea he was gay nor were they aware that he was performing in adult films. According to Stefano's older sister Linda, he told the family that he was a male model. She later found out about his real occupation but did not inform their mother.

During his lifetime, he was the subject of rumors regarding his relationships with prominent entertainment industry figures who were known to be gay. At a May 1990 dinner and interview with Jess Cagle (Entertainment Weekly) and Rick X (host of Manhattan Cable TV's The Closet Case Show), Stefano discussed an alleged series of "dates" with David Geffen, who at one point implored Stefano to quit using drugs.   After the videotaped interview appeared on Rick X's show, OutWeek Magazine "outed" Geffen,  who went on to announce his homosexuality at an AIDS fundraiser.

Stefano danced at the Gaiety Theatre, New York (male burlesque) in the late 1980s and early 1990s.  He was one of the more famous Gaiety dancers (and porn stars), having been featured in Madonna's Sex book in 1992, as well as having a biography written about him by Charles Isherwood, Wonder Bread and Ecstasy, that touches on his life as an erotic dancer at the Gaiety.

Over the course of his five-year career, Stefano appeared in 58 gay adult films, and two music videos with Madonna. Despite his success, Stefano did not save his earnings and relapsed into drug and alcohol abuse. Contrary to rumor he was never officially diagnosed as HIV+ by any medical professionals.

Death
On November 26, 1994, Stefano's body was found in a motel room in Hollywood. It was later determined by the Medical Examiner that he died of an accidental speedball overdose (in his case, a mixture of cocaine, morphine, heroin, and ketamine). He was 26.

He is buried next to his father, Nicholas A. Iacona Sr., in the Immaculate Heart of Mary Cemetery in Linwood, Pennsylvania.

Legacy
In 1996, Stefano's life was chronicled in the book, Wonder Bread and Ecstasy: The Life and Death of Joey Stefano by Charles Isherwood.

His life is also the subject of a one-man-play, Homme Fatale: The Fast Life and Slow Death of Joey Stefano, by Australian playwright Barry Lowe.

Director Chad Darnell has been working on a film based on Stefano's life. The film has been in development since 2010 and is tentatively titled X-Rated.

A second biography of the actor, Joey Stefano: The Life, Loves & Legacy of the Prince of Passion by British celebrity biographer David Bret was published in 2015.

Awards
1990 XRCO Award – Newcomer
1995 AVN Award – Gay Video Performer of the Year
1997 AVN Hall of Fame

See also
List of male performers in gay porn films

References

External links
 
 

 

1968 births
1994 deaths
20th-century American male actors
American actors in gay pornographic films
American people of Italian descent
Burials in Pennsylvania
Cocaine-related deaths in California
Deaths by heroin overdose in California
Gay pornographic film actors
American gay actors
LGBT people from Pennsylvania
People from Chester, Pennsylvania
People with HIV/AIDS
Pornographic film actors from Pennsylvania
20th-century American LGBT people